Lukáš Klein and Alex Molčan were the defending champions but chose not to defend their title.

Jonathan Eysseric and Quentin Halys won the title after defeating Hendrik Jebens and Niklas Schell 7–6(8–6), 6–2 in the final.

Seeds

Draw

References

External links
 Main draw

Challenger La Manche - Doubles
2022 Doubles